Susie Feliz is an American lobbyist and political advisor who is serving as the assistant secretary of commerce for legislative and intergovernmental affairs in the Biden administration.

Education 
Feliz earned a Bachelor of Arts degree in public affairs and biology from the University of Denver and a Master of Public Administration from the George Washington University.

Career 
From 2002 to 2005, Feliz served as a legislative aide for Senator Hillary Clinton. She was then the legislative director for Texas Congressman Al Green and California Congresswoman Karen Bass. She joined the National Urban League in 2013 and has since worked as the organization's senior director of health and education policy, senior director for policy and legislative affairs, and vice president for policy and legislative affairs.

Assistant Secretary of Commerce 
On March 11, 2022, President Joe Biden nominated Feliz to be an assistant secretary of commerce for legislative and intergovernmental affairs. On August 4, 2022, her nomination was confirmed in the Senate by voice vote. She was sworn into office on September 6, 2022.

Personal life 
In 2018, Feliz married Jose Luis Feliz, a United States Navy captain and assistant commander in the Naval Supply Systems Command.

References 

Year of birth missing (living people)
Living people
Biden administration personnel
George Washington University alumni
United States Department of Commerce officials
University of Denver alumni